Imlek may refer to:

 "Imlek" (Hokkien pronunciation of 阴历, pinyin: yin li), the Indonesian name for the Lunar New Year,
 Imlek a.d., a Serbian food company.